Adams Island may refer to:

Adams Island (Antarctica), Antarctica
Adams Island, New Zealand, New Zealand
Adams Island, in Lake Winnipeg, Manitoba, Canada
Adams Island (Massachusetts), Massachusetts, United States
Adams Island, in the Restigouche River, New Brunswick, Canada
Adams Island, in Shubenacadie Lake, Nova Scotia, Canada
Adams Island (Nunavut), Canada
Adams Island, in Reindeer Lake, Saskatchewan, Canada
Adams Island, in the North Saskatchewan River, Saskatchewan, Canada

See also
 Adam Island, Grenada
 Adam Island, Israel
 Adams Islands, Newfoundland and Labrador, Canada